Margit Senf (born 25 November 1945 in Leipzig) is a former pair skater who represented East Germany and the United Team of Germany in competition.  With partner Peter Göbel, she won the gold medal at the East German Figure Skating Championships in 1960, 1961, and 1963.  In 1961, the pair won the bronze medal at the European Figure Skating Championships, and they also competed at the 1964 Winter Olympics, finishing 14th.

Results
pairs with Göbel

External links
 

1945 births
Living people
Sportspeople from Leipzig
German female pair skaters
Figure skaters at the 1964 Winter Olympics
Olympic figure skaters of the United Team of Germany
European Figure Skating Championships medalists